Dasht-e Kuch or Dasht-i-Kuch or Dasht Kooch or Dasht Kuch may refer to:
 Dasht-e Kuch-e Bala
 Dasht-e Kuch-e Pain